Rems or REMS may refer to:

 Radiofrequency Echographic Multi Spectrometry
 Rams (card game), a card game also known as Rems
 Rapid eye movement sleep, a sleep phase
 Rems (river), a river in Germany
 Research, Evaluation, Measurement, and Statistics, a concentration in Educational Psychology at Texas Tech University
No. 204 Reserve Equipment Maintenance Satellite at RCAF Station Assiniboia
 Risk Evaluation and Mitigation Strategies, risk management plans to ensure safe use of dangerous pharmaceuticals
 Romanian Electron Microscopy Society, a member society of the European Microscopy Society and consequently the International Federation of Societies for Microscopy.
 Rover Environmental Monitoring Station, meteorological sensors on the Mars rover Curiosity
 Ryan Rems, a Filipino comedian and television personality
 Rems Umeasiegbu, a Nigerian professor, scholar, novelist, poet and folklorist
 Tadej Rems, a Slovenian football player

See also 
 Rem (disambiguation)
Knoellia remsis, a bacterium discovered in, and named after the Regenerative Enclosed Life Support Module Simulator (REMS)